(born July 23, 1948) is a Japanese sprint canoer who competed in the mid-1970s. At the 1976 Summer Olympics in Montreal, he was eliminated in the repechages of the C-1 500 m, disqualified in the repechages of the C-2 500 m, and eliminated in the semifinals of the C-2 1000 m events.

External links
Sports-reference.com profile

1948 births
Canoeists at the 1976 Summer Olympics
Japanese male canoeists
Living people
Olympic canoeists of Japan